Markt Rettenbach is a municipality and market town in the district of Unterallgäu in Bavaria, Germany.

References

Unterallgäu